The Battle Range is a subrange of the Selkirk Mountains of the Columbia Mountains in southeastern British Columbia, Canada, located between Incomappleux River and Duncan River south of Battle Brook. It is named in association with Battle Brook which in turn was the site of a legendary battle between a grizzly bear and 1890s prospector George Ritchie.

Climate

Based on the Köppen climate classification, the Battle Range is located in a subarctic climate zone with cold, snowy winters, and mild summers. Winter temperatures can drop below −20 °C with wind chill factors below −30 °C.

See also 
 Geography of British Columbia
 Beaver Mountain
 Mount Butters
 Foremast Peak
 Mainmast Peak
 Moby Dick Mountain
 Mount Duncan
 Mount Proteus
 Nautilus Mountain
 Omoo Peak
 Pequod Mountain
 Scylla Mountain
 Wrong Peak

References

Battle Range in the Canadian Mountain Encyclopedia

Selkirk Mountains